Takatsu Station may refer to:
 Takatsu Station (Kanagawa), a railway station in Kanagawa, Japan
 Takatsu Station (Kyoto), a railway station in Kyoto, Japan